Hannah E. Longshore (May 30, 1819October 19, 1901) was a physician in the United States and the first woman to be appointed to the faculty of a US medical college, at the Woman's Medical College of Pennsylvania, where she was part of the first graduating class. She then taught at the medical college and later at Pennsylvania Medical University before entering private practice.

Personal life 
Hannah E. Myers was born to Samuel Myers and Paulina Oden Myers, a Quaker family in Sandy Spring, Maryland, in 1819. She had six siblings and when she was 14 the family moved to Ohio.

On March 26, 1841, she married Thomas Ellwood Longshore of Philadelphia, who was very supportive of her work. When the couple's two children were young, Longshore suspended her medical studies for six years, but resumed them when her youngest child was four years old.

Two of her sisters, Jane Myers and Mary Frame Myers Thomas, were also physicians having both graduated from Pennsylvania Medical University. Longshore's daughter Lucretia, later Lucretia Longshore Blankenburg, went on to become a proponent of public health measures in Philadelphia.

In 1901, Hannah Longshore died of uremia at 82 in Philadelphia.

Career 
Longshore received private medical training from her brother-in-law Prof. Joseph S. Longshore (1809-1879) before being among the first class of ten women graduating in 1851 from the Female Medical College of Pennsylvania, which had been founded by several male doctors including Prof. Longshore. After graduating, she served as "demonstrator of anatomy" at the college for two years, making her the first female faculty member at a US medical college. She taught for a year at the Female Medical College of Pennsylvania, and then taught anatomy at the Pennsylvania Medical University from 1853 to 1857.

During the course of her career, Longshore wrote and gave public talks (titled "Lectures to Women") and, according to her husband, saw approximately 40 patients a day at her clinical practice. At first she found difficulty after opening her practice; other doctors mocked her and pharmacists refused to fulfill her prescriptions - a hardship that she countered by carrying her own medications, thus "pleasing her patients."

Longshore eventually stopped teaching and lecturing in favor of focusing on her practice, where she worked for a further 40 years and retired with a "modest fortune."

References

Further reading 

1819 births
1901 deaths
People from Sandy Spring, Maryland
Physicians from Maryland
Woman's Medical College of Pennsylvania alumni
19th-century American women physicians
19th-century American physicians
Deaths from kidney disease
Physicians from Philadelphia
Woman's Medical College of Pennsylvania faculty